Adolf Fyodorovich Marx (2 February 1838 – ), last name also spelled Marcks and recently Marks,  known as A. F. Marx, was an influential 19th-century German publisher in the Russian Empire best known for the weekly journal Niva. He obtained Russian Empire citizenship.

Marx was born in Stettin, Kingdom of Prussia the son of Friedrich Marx, a maker of tower clocks. After finishing his education, he went to work in a bookstore, and in 1859 moved to the Russian Empire to take jobs in the book trade, first with F. A. Bietepage and I. K. Kalugin to deal with their German books, and then in the foreign department of Moritz Wolf's bookstore, "one of the best bookshops in St. Petersburg." After a brief period as chief editor for German and French correspondence for the Great Russian Railway Company, he decided to open his own publishing company in St. Petersburg in 1869.

He published books on literature, art, and history, and from 1870 Niva, the weekly journal for which he is best known. The office of the publishing house was at 22 Malaya Morskaya Street and its printing house at 29 Izmaylovsky Avenue. After the death of Marx the publishing house was reorganized as the A. F. Marx Publishing and Printing Joint-Stock Company. In 1897, he was awarded a title of nobility. He died in 1904 and was buried in the cemetery of Novodevichy Monastery.

References

Notes

Sources
Saint Petersburg Encyclopedia entry
Deutsche Buchhändler biography (in German)
Lyudi biography (in Russian)
TextReferat biography (in Russian)

1838 births
1904 deaths
Emigrants from the Kingdom of Prussia to the Russian Empire
People from Szczecin
People from the Province of Pomerania

Journalists from the Russian Empire
Book publishers (people) from the Russian Empire
Magazine founders from the Russian Empire
Burials at Novodevichy Cemetery